Alin Coțan (born 30 October 1982) is a Romanian former footballer who played as a left midfielder for clubs such as: Bihor Oradea, FC Sopron, Petrolul Ploiești or SG Johannesberg, among others. After retirement, Coțan started to work as a football manager in the German lower division, at first for SG Eiterfeld/Leimbach, then moving to SG Dittlofrod/Körnbach.

References

External links

Alin Coțan at fupa.net

1982 births
Living people
Sportspeople from Timișoara
Romanian footballers
Association football midfielders
Liga I players
FC Bihor Oradea players
FC UTA Arad players
Liga II players
CF Liberty Oradea players
FC Petrolul Ploiești players
CS Turnu Severin players
CS Național Sebiș players
Nemzeti Bajnokság I players
FC Sopron players
Romanian expatriate footballers
Romanian expatriate sportspeople in Hungary
Expatriate footballers in Hungary
Romanian expatriate sportspeople in Germany
Expatriate footballers in Germany
Romanian football managers